Kálmán Sóvári (21 December 1940 – 16 December 2020) was a Hungarian footballer.

Career
He played for Újpesti Dózsa as a defender. He played 17 games for the Hungary national football team. Sóvári is most famous for playing in two 1962 World Cup qualifying matches and one match in the 1966 FIFA World Cup finals.

His father, Kálmán Sóvári was an Olympic wrestler.

References

1940 births
2020 deaths
Hungarian footballers
Újpest FC players
1962 FIFA World Cup players
1966 FIFA World Cup players
Hungary international footballers
Footballers from Budapest
Association football defenders